The Second Mr. Bush is a 1940 British comedy film directed by John Paddy Carstairs and starring Wallace Evennett, Evelyn Roberts and Kay Walsh. It was made at Welwyn Studios by British National Films.

Cast
 Wallace Evennett as Mr. Bush  
 Evelyn Roberts as Major Dawson  
 Kay Walsh as Angela Windel-Todd  
 Derrick De Marney as Tony  
 Barbara Everest as Mrs. Windel-Tod  
 Ruth Maitland as Mrs. Bush  
 Kenneth Buckley as David  
 A. Bromley Davenport as Colonel Barlow  
 Hal Walters as Joe 
 W.T. Hodge as David's brother 
 Vi Kaley 
 Robert Rendel 
 Margaret Yarde

References

Bibliography
 Low, Rachael. Filmmaking in 1930s Britain. George Allen & Unwin, 1985.
 Wood, Linda. British Films, 1927-1939. British Film Institute, 1986.

External links

1940 films
British comedy films
1940 comedy films
Films shot at Welwyn Studios
Films directed by John Paddy Carstairs
British black-and-white films
1940s English-language films
1940s British films